Yevhen Oleksandrovych Seleznyov (born 20 July 1985) is a Ukrainian professional footballer who plays as a striker for Mynai.

He previously played three spells at Shakhtar Donetsk, winning the UEFA Cup in 2009, and a domestic double three years later. He was the league's top scorer in their double-winning season, and maintained the honour the following season with Dnipro.

A full international since 2008, Seleznyov has earned over 50 caps for Ukraine, scoring 11 international goals. He was part of their squad when they co-hosted UEFA Euro 2012.

Career

Shakhtar Donetsk
Born in Makiivka, Ukrainian SSR, Soviet Union, Yevhen Seleznyov is a product of the Shakhtar Donetsk and the Shakhtar Makiivka academies. After being promoted to professional level in 2002, he had difficult time to secure its place in the first team and played for the club's second and third teams in lower leagues as well as the club's reserve team. His chance to distinguish himself at premiers Seleznyov gained in the winter of 2007 when he went on a one-and-a-half year loan deal to Arsenal Kyiv. Seleznyov was one of the top goal-scorers in the 2007–08 Ukrainian Premier League, having scored 17 goals in 24 games. Soon after returning to Donetsk he was called up to the Ukraine national team.

On completion of his loan, he returned to Donetsk and signed a 5-year deal. He scored his first goal for Shakhtar on 3 August against Illichivets Mariupol in a 3–0 victory· He played three matches in the UEFA Champions League, including  a 5–0 home win over FC Basel, in which he came on as a substitute and scored a goal.

He made two appearances in the UEFA Cup as they won it in his first season at the club: on 19 February 2009, a minute after replacing Oleksandr Hladkyy, he headed in Jádson's free kick with his first touch of the game to score past Tottenham Hotspur goalkeeper Heurelho Gomes to open a 2–0 win.

Dnipro Dnipropetrovsk

On 25 July 2009, Seleznyov signed with rivals Dnipro Dnipropetrovsk in a deal worth €4.5 million. That same day, he scored his first goal for Dnipro on his debut against Metalist Kharkiv.
In the next two seasons, Seleznyov established himself at Dnipro as a target man of good scoring ability, especially with his head. He was the top scorer of the 2010–11 Ukrainian Premier League season with 17 goals in 24 games.

Return to Shakhtar Donetsk
On 22 June 2011, Dnipro re-sold him to his previous club Shakhtar Donetsk. The transfer fee was undisclosed but it is estimated to be around €5 million. In September 2011 Seleznyov was involved in multi car pile up, while driving his Maserati in Donetsk. Luckily nobody got physically hurt.

At the end of the 2011–12 season, Seleznyov was Shakhtar's top league goalscorer, and joint top league scorer outright with Maicon with 14, despite the latter scoring two penalties. Seleznyov scored against APOEL Nicosia in the Champions League, in a 2–0 win.

Return to Dnipro Dnipropetrovsk
On 29 August 2012, Seleznyov went back to Dnipro for an undisclosed fee.

On 7 May 2015, Seleznyov scored an 80th-minute equaliser in the Europa League semi-final first leg against Napoli, making it 1–1 and giving Dnipro the away goals advantage heading into the second leg. In the second leg, at the Olympic Stadium in Kyiv, a week later, Seleznyov scored the only goal of the game as Dnipro won 1–0, to go through to their first European final on 27 May 2015, 2–1 winners on aggregate. Dnipro lost the final 3–2, with Seleznyov entering the game in the 78th minute.

Kuban Krasnodar
On 25 February 2016, he signed a contract with the Russian team FC Kuban Krasnodar. Seleznyov was released by Dnipro to Kuban for free under a condition that Seleznyov will forgive the club's debts which exceed over 1 mln Euros. Before signing with Kuban, Seleznyov refused offers from some clubs of the English Premier League.

On 11 May 2016 in an interview with the channel Football 1 Yevhen Seleznyov confirmed that he terminated the contract with Kuban. Following that season Kuban relegated to the Russian First League.

Second return to Shakhtar Donetsk
On 14 May 2016, FC Shakhtar Donetsk confirmed that the club had signed a 2-year contract with Seleznyov. In December 2016 on mutual consent Seleznyov left the club.

Kardemir Karabükspor
Less than a week later after leaving Shakhtar, it was announced that Seleznyov signed a contract with the Turkish Kardemir Karabükspor which only recently returned to the Turkish Super League.

Akhisarspor
On 10 May 2018, Seleznyov helped Akhisar Belediyespor win their first professional trophy, the 2017–18 Turkish Cup.

International career
On 24 May 2008, he made his debut for the Ukraine national football team in a friendly against Netherlands. He scored his first international goal against Norway in Dnipropetrovsk on 19 November, the only goal of the game.

Seleznyov was a member of Ukraine's squad as they co-hosted UEFA Euro 2012, but did not enter the field of play in their group stage exit.

On 6 September 2013, Seleznyov was one of nine Ukrainian players to score in their 9–0 thrashing of San Marino at the Arena Lviv in qualification for the following year's World Cup. He scored his first international two-goal haul on 15 October in the reverse fixture, as Ukraine won 8–0 in Serravalle; the result qualified Ukraine for the play-offs, which they lost to France.

Career statistics

Club

International

Scores and results list Ukraine's goal tally first.

Honours

Team
FC Shakhtar Donetsk
Ukrainian Premier League: 2011–12
Ukrainian Cup: 2011–12
Ukrainian Super Cup: 2008, 2012
UEFA Cup: 2008–09

FC Dnipro Dnipropetrovsk
UEFA Europa League runner-up: 2014–15

Akhisar Belediyespor
 Turkish Cup: 2017–18
 Turkish Super Cup: 2018

Personal
Ukraine Premier League top scorer: 2010–11, 2011–12
CIS Cup top scorer: 2006

References

External links

 Profile on FC Dnipro Dnipropetrovsk website 
 
 
 

1985 births
Living people
Ukrainian footballers
Ukraine international footballers
Ukraine under-21 international footballers
Association football forwards
FC Shakhtar Donetsk players
UEFA Cup winning players
FC Shakhtar-2 Donetsk players
FC Shakhtar-3 Donetsk players
FC Arsenal Kyiv players
FC Dnipro players
Ukrainian Premier League players
Ukrainian First League players
Ukrainian Second League players
Sportspeople from Makiivka
UEFA Euro 2012 players
Ukrainian Premier League top scorers
FC Kuban Krasnodar players
Russian Premier League players
Ukrainian expatriate footballers
Expatriate footballers in Russia
Ukrainian expatriate sportspeople in Russia
UEFA Euro 2016 players
Kardemir Karabükspor footballers
Akhisarspor footballers
Expatriate footballers in Turkey
Ukrainian expatriate sportspeople in Turkey
Süper Lig players
TFF First League players
Expatriate footballers in Spain
Ukrainian expatriate sportspeople in Spain
Segunda División players
Málaga CF players
Bursaspor footballers
FC Kolos Kovalivka players
FC Mynai players